The Wise River is a tributary of the Big Hole River, approximately 30 mi (48 km) long, in southwestern Montana in the United States. It rises in the Beaverhead National Forest in the Pioneer Mountains in Beaverhead County. It flows NNW through the mountains and joins the Big Hole near the town of Wise River.  The river has also been known as Elkhorn Creek.

The river is a popular destination for fly fishing. The Wise is a Class II river for stream access for recreational purposes.

See also

List of rivers of Montana
Montana Stream Access Law

References

 

Rivers of Montana
Rivers of Beaverhead County, Montana